False River is a river in Nunavik, Quebec, Canada.

Rivers of Nord-du-Québec
Nunavik
Tributaries of Hudson Bay